Union Sportive Lajeune de Pignon is a professional football club based in Pignon, Haiti.

References

Football clubs in Haiti
Association football clubs established in 2007
2007 establishments in Haiti
Nord (Haitian department)